Fanny Bendixen (1820May 2, 1899) was a hotelier and saloon–keeper during the gold–rush period in British Columbia.

Fanny was an important figure in the service industry surrounding the Cariboo gold rush. Her hotels at Barkerville, Lightning Creek and Stanley were examples of her skills in the business world and her pioneering of opportunities for frontier women.

References

External links
 British Columbia reconsidered: essays on women
 Canadian History: Beginnings to Confederation

1820 births
1899 deaths
Businesspeople from British Columbia
Canadian hoteliers
Cariboo people
Canadian women in business
Saloonkeepers
19th-century Canadian businesspeople